Rubin "the Hurricane" Carter (May 6, 1937 – April 20, 2014) was an American-Canadian middleweight boxer, wrongfully   convicted and imprisoned for murder, until released following a petition of habeas corpus after almost 20 years in prison.

In 1966, Carter, and his co-accused, John Artis, were arrested for a triple homicide which was committed at the Lafayette Bar and Grill in Paterson, New Jersey, United States. Shortly after the killings at 2:30 am, a car, carrying Carter, Artis, and a third man, was stopped by police outside the bar while its occupants were on their way home from a nearby nightclub. They were allowed to go on their way but, after dropping off the third man, Carter and Artis were stopped and arrested while they were passing the bar a second time, 45 minutes later.

Carter and Artis were interrogated for 17 hours, released, then re-arrested weeks later. In 1967, they were convicted of all three murders, and given life sentences, to be served in Rahway State Prison; a retrial in 1976 upheld their sentences, but they were overturned in 1985. Prosecutors appealed to the U.S. Supreme Court, but declined to try the case a third time after the appeal failed.

Carter's autobiography, titled The Sixteenth Round, written while he was in prison, was published in 1974 by Viking Press. The story inspired the 1975 Bob Dylan song "Hurricane" and the 1999 film The Hurricane, starring Denzel Washington as Carter.  From 1993 to 2005, Carter served as executive director of the Association in Defence of the Wrongly Convicted (later rebranded as Innocence Canada).

In 2019, the case was the focus of a 13-part BBC podcast series, The Hurricane Tapes. The series was based on interviews which were conducted with survivors, case notes which were taken during the original investigations, and 40 hours of recorded interviews of Carter by the author Ken Klonsky, who cited them in his 2011 book The Eye of the Hurricane.

Early life 
Carter was born in Clifton, New Jersey in 1937, the fourth of seven children. He later admitted to a troubled relationship with his father, a strict disciplinarian; at the age of eleven, he was sentenced to a juvenile reformatory for assault, having stabbed a man who he alleged had tried to sexually assault him. Carter escaped from the reformatory in 1954 and joined the United States Army. A few months after completing basic training at Fort Jackson, South Carolina, he was sent to West Germany. While in Germany, Carter began to box for the Army. He was discharged in 1956 as unfit for service, after four courts-martial. Shortly after his discharge, he returned home to New Jersey, was convicted of two muggings and sent to prison.

Boxing career

After his release from prison in September 1961, Carter became a professional boxer. At  , Carter was shorter than the average middleweight, but he fought all of his professional career at 155–160 lb (70–72.6 kg). His aggressive style and punching power (resulting in many early-round knockouts) drew attention, establishing him as a crowd favorite and earning him the nickname "Hurricane". After he defeated a number of middleweight contenders—such as Florentino Fernandez, Holley Mims, Gomeo Brennan, and George Benton—the boxing world took notice. The Ring first listed him as one of its "Top 10" middleweight contenders in July 1963. At the end of 1965, they ranked him as the number five middleweight.

He fought six times in 1963, winning four bouts and losing two. He remained ranked in the lower part of the top 10 until December 20, when he surprised the boxing world by flooring past and future world champion Emile Griffith twice in the first round and scoring a technical knockout. That win resulted in The Rings ranking of Carter as the number three contender for Joey Giardello's world middleweight title. Carter won two more fights (one a decision over future heavyweight champion Jimmy Ellis) in 1964, before meeting Giardello in Philadelphia for a 15-round championship match on December 14. Carter landed a few solid rights to the head in the fourth round that left Giardello staggering, but was unable to follow them up, and Giardello took control of the fight in the fifth round. The judges decided unanimously in favor of Giardello.

After that fight, Carter's ranking in The Ring began to decline. He fought nine times in 1965, winning five but losing three of four against contenders Luis Manuel Rodríguez, Dick Tiger, and Harry Scott. Tiger, in particular, floored Carter three times in their match. "It was", Carter said, "the worst beating that I took in my life—inside or outside the ring". During his visit to London to fight Scott, Carter was involved in an incident in which a shot was fired in his hotel room.

Carter's career record in boxing was 27 wins with 19 total knockouts (8 KOs and 11 TKOs), 12 losses, and one draw in 40 fights. He received an honorary championship title belt from the World Boxing Council in 1993 (as did Joey Giardello at the same banquet) and was later inducted into the New Jersey Boxing Hall of Fame.

Arrest and conviction

At approximately 2:30 AM on June 17, 1966, two men entered the Lafayette Bar and Grill in Paterson, New Jersey, and began shooting. The bartender, James Oliver, and a customer, Fred Nauyoks, were killed immediately. Hazel Tanis died in a hospital a month later, having suffered multiple wounds from shotgun pellets; a third customer, Willie Marins, survived the attack, despite a head wound that cost him the sight in one eye. When questioned, both told police the shooters had been black males, but neither identified Carter or John Artis.

Ten minutes after the murders, around 2:40 AM, a police cruiser stopped Carter and Artis in a rental car, returning from a night out at the Nite Spot, a nearby bar; Carter was in the back, with Artis driving, and a third man, John Royster, in the passenger seat. The police recognised Carter, a well-known and controversial local figure, but let him go. Minutes later, the same officers solicited a description of the getaway car from two eyewitnesses outside the bar, Patricia "Patty" Valentine and Alfred Bello.

Bello later admitted he was in the area acting as a lookout while an accomplice, Arthur Bradley, broke into a nearby warehouse. At the time, he claimed to have discovered the bodies when he entered the bar to buy cigarettes; it also transpired that he took the opportunity to empty the cash register, and ran into the police as he came out. At the trial, he testified he was approaching the Lafayette when two black males, one with a shotgun, the other a pistol, came around the corner. He ran from them, and they got into a white car that was double-parked near the Lafayette.

Valentine lived above the bar, and heard the shots; like Bello, she reported seeing two black men leave the bar, then get into a white car. They reportedly described it as white, with "a geometric design, sort of a butterfly type design in the back of the car", and New York state license plates, with blue background and orange lettering. Another neighbor, Ronald Ruggiero, also heard the shots, and said that, from his window, he saw Alfred Bello running west on Lafayette Street toward 16th Street. He then heard the screech of tires and saw a white car shoot past, heading west, with two black males in the front seat.

Valentine initially stated the car had rear lights which lit up completely like butterflies; at the retrial in 1976, she changed this to an accurate description of Carter's car, which had conventional tail-lights with aluminum decoration in a butterfly shape. This aligned with that provided by Bello; the prosecution later suggested the confusion was the result of a misreading of a court transcript by the defense.

Having dropped off Royster, Carter was now being driven home by Artis; they were stopped again at 3:00 AM, and ordered to follow the police to the station, where they were arrested. However, variances in descriptions given by Valentine and Bello, the physical characteristics of the attackers provided by the two survivors, lack of forensic evidence, and the timeline provided by the police were key factors in the conviction being overturned in 1985.

Forensics later established the victims were shot by a .32-caliber pistol and a 12-gauge shotgun, although the weapons themselves were never found. There was no forensic evidence linking Carter or Artis to the murders; while gun residue tests were commonly used, DeSimone, the lead detective, later claimed he had no time to bring in an expert to carry out the tests. He did arrange for an expert to conduct lie detector tests, which they passed; in 1976, a second report was discovered, claiming they failed. After 17 hours of interrogation, they were released. Carter and Artis voluntarily appeared before a grand jury, which found there was no case to answer. 

However, several months later, Bello changed his story, after the police discovered why he was in the area, and his theft from the cash register. He positively identified Artis as one of the attackers, while Bradley now came forward to claim Carter was the other; based on this, the two were arrested and indicted. Bello later claimed that in return he was promised the U$10,500 reward offered for catching the killers, though it was never paid.

The rental car had been impounded when Carter and Artis were arrested, and retained by police; five days after their release a detective reported that on searching it again he discovered two unfired rounds, one .32 caliber, the other 12-gauge. Neither matched those retrieved from the victims; the .32 round was brass, rather than copper, while the shotgun shell was an older model, with a different wad and color.

Asked to account for these differences at the trial, the prosecution produced a second report, allegedly lodged 75 minutes after the murders which recorded the two rounds. They were unable to explain why, having that evidence, the police released the men, or why standard 'bag and tag' procedure was not followed. They also argued that, since the expended rounds retrieved at the scene were also a mixture, the fact that the two rounds did not match was meaningless; what did matter was they were the same caliber as those used in the shootings.

The defense, led by Raymond A. Brown, focused on inconsistencies in the evidence given by eyewitnesses Marins and Bello. He also produced witnesses who confirmed Carter and Artis were still in the Nite Spot at the time of the shootings. The all-white jury convicted both men of first-degree murder, with a recommendation of mercy, so that they were not sentenced to death. Judge Samuel Larner imposed one concurrent and two consecutive life sentences on Carter, and three concurrent life sentences on Artis.

Retrial and release
In 1974, Bello and Bradley withdrew their identifications of Carter and Artis, and these recantations were used as the basis for a motion for a new trial. Judge Samuel Larner denied the motion on December 11, saying they "lacked the ring of truth".

Despite Larner's ruling, Madison Avenue advertising executive George Lois organized a campaign on Carter's behalf, which led to increasing public support for a retrial or pardon. Boxer Muhammad Ali lent his support to the campaign (including publicly wishing Carter good luck on his appeal during his appearance on The Tonight Show Starring Johnny Carson in September 1973). Bob Dylan co-wrote (with Jacques Levy) and performed a song called "Hurricane" (1975), which declared that Carter was innocent. On December 7, 1975, Dylan performed the song at a concert at Trenton State Prison, where Carter was temporarily an inmate.

However, during the hearing on the recantations, defense attorneys also argued that Bello and Bradley had lied during the 1967 trial, telling the jurors that they had made only certain narrow, limited deals with prosecutors in exchange for their trial testimony. A detective taped one interrogation of Bello in 1966, and when it was played during the recantation hearing, defense attorneys argued that the tape revealed promises beyond what Bello had testified to. If so, prosecutors had either had a Brady obligation to disclose this additional exculpatory evidence, or a duty to disclose that their witnesses had lied on the stand.

Larner denied this second argument as well, but the New Jersey Supreme Court unanimously held that the evidence of various deals made between the prosecution and witnesses Bello and Bradley should have been disclosed to the defense before or during the 1967 trial as this could have "affected the jury's evaluation of the credibility" of the eyewitnesses. "The defendants' right to a fair trial was substantially prejudiced", said Justice Mark Sullivan. The court set aside the original convictions and granted Carter and Artis a new trial.

Despite the difficulties of prosecuting a ten-year-old case, Prosecutor Burrell Ives Humphreys decided to try Carter and Artis again. To ensure, as best he could, that he did not use perjured testimony to obtain a conviction, Humphreys had Bello polygraphed—once by Leonard H. Harrelson and a second time by Richard Arther, both well-known and respected experts in the field.  Both men concluded that Bello was telling the truth when he said that he had seen Carter outside the Lafayette immediately after the murders.

However, Harrelson also reported orally that Bello had been inside the bar shortly before and at the time of the shooting, a conclusion that contradicted Bello's 1967 trial testimony wherein he had said that he had been on the street at the time of the shooting. Despite this oral report, Harrelson's subsequent written report stated that Bello's 1967 testimony had been truthful.

Second conviction and appeal
During the new trial in 1976, Alfred Bello repeated his 1967 testimony, identifying Carter and Artis as the two armed men he had seen outside the Lafayette Grill. Bradley refused to cooperate with prosecutors, and neither prosecution nor defense called him as a witness.

The defense responded with testimony from multiple witnesses who identified Carter at the locations he claimed to be at when the murders took place.  Investigator Fred Hogan, whose efforts had led to the recantations of Bello and Bradley, appeared as a defense witness. Hogan was asked on cross examinations whether any bribes or inducements were offered to Bello to secure his recantation, which Hogan denied. His original handwritten notes on his conversations with Bello were entered into evidence. The defense also pointed out the inconsistencies in the testimony of Patricia Valentine, and read the 1967 testimony of William Marins, who had died in 1973, noting that his descriptions of the shooters were drastically different from Artis and Carter's actual appearances.

The court also heard testimony from a Carter associate that Passaic County prosecutors had tried to pressure her into testifying against Carter.  Prosecutors denied the charge.  After deliberating for almost nine hours, the jury again found Carter and Artis guilty of the murders. Judge Leopizzi re-imposed the same sentences on both men: a double life sentence for Carter, a single life sentence for Artis.

Artis was released on parole in 1981.  Carter's attorneys continued to appeal. In 1982, the Supreme Court of New Jersey affirmed his convictions (4–3). Although the justices felt that the prosecutors should have disclosed Harrelson's oral opinion (about Bello's location at the time of the murders) to the defense, only a minority thought this was material. The majority thus concluded that the prosecution had not withheld information the Brady disclosure law required them to provide to the defense.

According to bail bondswoman Carolyn Kelley, in 1975–1976 she helped raise funds to win a second trial for Carter, which resulted in his release on bail in March 1976. On a fund-raising trip the following month, Kelley said the boxer beat her severely over a disputed hotel bill. The Philadelphia Daily News reported the alleged beating in a front-page story several weeks later, and celebrity support for Carter quickly eroded, though Carter denied the accusation and there was insufficient evidence for legal prosecution. Mae Thelma Basket, whom Carter had married in 1963, divorced him after their second child was born, because she found out that he had been unfaithful to her.

Federal court action
In 1985, Carter's attorneys filed a petition for a writ of habeas corpus in federal court.  Later that year, Judge Haddon Lee Sarokin of the United States District Court for the District of New Jersey granted the writ, noting that the prosecution had been "predicated upon an appeal to racism rather than reason, and concealment rather than disclosure", and set aside the convictions.  Carter, 48 years old, was freed without bail in November 1985.

Prosecutors appealed Sarokin's ruling to the Third Circuit Court of Appeals and filed a motion with the court to return Carter to prison pending the outcome of the appeal. The court denied this motion and eventually upheld Sarokin's opinion, affirming his Brady analysis without commenting on his other rationale.

The prosecutors appealed to the United States Supreme Court, which declined to hear the case.

Prosecutors therefore could have tried Carter (and Artis) a third time, but decided not to, and filed a motion to dismiss the original indictments. "It is just not legally feasible to sustain a prosecution, and not practical after almost 22 years to be trying anyone", said New Jersey Attorney General W. Cary Edwards. Acting Passaic County Prosecutor John P. Goceljak said several factors made a retrial impossible, including Bello's "current unreliability" as a witness and the unavailability of other witnesses. Goceljak also doubted whether the prosecution could reintroduce the racially motivated crime theory due to the federal court rulings.  A judge granted the motion to dismiss, bringing an end to the legal proceedings.

Post emancipation
Carter lived in Toronto, Ontario, where he became a Canadian citizen, and was executive director of the Association in Defence of the Wrongly Convicted (AIDWYC) from 1993 until 2005. Carter resigned when the AIDWYC declined to support Carter's protest of the appointment (to a judgeship) of Susan MacLean, who was the prosecutor of Canadian Guy Paul Morin, who served over eighteen months in prison for rape and murder until exonerated by DNA evidence.

Carter's second marriage was to Lisa Peters. The couple separated later.

In 1996, Carter, then 59, was arrested when Toronto police mistakenly identified him as a suspect in his thirties believed to have sold drugs to an undercover officer. He was released after the police realized their error.

Carter often served as a motivational speaker. On October 14, 2005, he received two honorary Doctorates of Law, one from York University (Toronto, Ontario, Canada) and one from Griffith University (Brisbane, Queensland, Australia), in recognition of his work with AIDWYC and the Innocence Project. Carter received the Abolition Award from Death Penalty Focus in 1996.

Prostate cancer and death
In March 2012, while attending the International Justice Conference in Burswood, Western Australia, Carter revealed that he had terminal prostate cancer.  At the time, doctors gave him between three and six months to live. Beginning shortly after that time, John Artis lived with and cared for Carter, and on April 20, 2014, he confirmed that Carter, at the age of 76, had succumbed to his illness. He was afterwards cremated and his ashes were scattered in part over Cape Cod and in part at a horse farm in Kentucky.

In the months leading up to his death, Carter had worked for the exoneration of David McCallum, a Brooklyn man who had been incarcerated since 1985 on charges of murder. Two months before his death, Carter published "Hurricane Carter's Dying Wish", an opinion piece in the New York Daily News, in which he asked for an independent review of McCallum's conviction. "I request only that McCallum be granted a full hearing by the Brooklyn conviction integrity unit, now under the auspices of the new district attorney, Ken Thompson. Knowing what I do, I am certain that when the facts are brought to light, Thompson will recommend his immediate release ... Just as my own verdict 'was predicated on racism rather than reason and on concealment rather than disclosure', as Sarokin wrote, so too was McCallum's", Carter wrote. On October 15, 2014, McCallum was exonerated.
John Artis died of an Abdominal aortic aneurysm on November 7, 2021, at the age of 75.

In popular culture
Carter's story inspired:
 The 1975 Bob Dylan song "Hurricane", which proclaimed that Carter was innocent. Carter appeared as himself in Dylan's 1978 movie Renaldo and Clara. In the 2019 film Rolling Thunder Revue: A Bob Dylan Story by Martin Scorsese, Dylan talked about his involvement with the Carter case and Carter was also interviewed in the film, describing his relationship with Dylan.
 Norman Jewison's 1999 feature film The Hurricane, starring Denzel Washington in the lead role as Carter. The film is about Rubin Carter's accusation, trials, and time spent in prison. Carter later discussed at a lecture how he fell in love with Washington's portrayal of him during auditions for The Hurricane, noting that boxer Marvelous Marvin Hagler and actors Wesley Snipes and Samuel L. Jackson all vied for the role. For his performance as Carter, Washington won the Golden Globe Award for Best Actor – Motion Picture Drama at the 57th Golden Globe Awards. Washington was also nominated for the Academy Award for Best Actor for his performance as Carter at the 72nd Academy Awards.

Professional boxing record

See also
 List of wrongful convictions in the United States
 Romeo Phillion
 Steve Hearon

References

Sources

External links

1937 births
2014 deaths
African-American boxers
American male boxers
American emigrants to Canada
American people convicted of assault
American people convicted of robbery
American convicts who became writers
Deaths from cancer in Ontario
Deaths from prostate cancer
Supreme Court of New Jersey
Overturned convictions in the United States
People convicted of murder by New Jersey
Sportspeople from Clifton, New Jersey
Prison writings
Prisoners sentenced to life imprisonment by New Jersey
Boxers from Toronto
United States Army soldiers
American people wrongfully convicted of murder
Canadian people of African-American descent
Boxers from New Jersey
Middleweight boxers
20th-century African-American sportspeople
Rubin Carter
Naturalized citizens of Canada
Sportspeople convicted of murder